The Rostock Motet Choir was founded in 1964 by Hartwig Eschenburg and gave concerts from the early days in famous churches and concert halls in East Germany. The Rostock Motet Choir is part of the church choir (St. Johannis-Kantorei) at St. John's Church in Rostock. The choir has performed inter alia at the Kreuzkirche, Dresden, St. Thomas' Church and the Neues Gewandhaus in Leipzig, as well as the Berlin Concert Hall. Many well-known soloists, such as Peter Schreier and Ludwig Güttler, have worked with the Rostock Motet Choir.

Discography 
Bach motets on Bach Edition Leipzig 1980-1984, Capriccio 2000
Bach motets on Bach Edition Leipzig 1980-1984, Delta 2006
Abendstille Berlin 1988
In Principio, Aliud 2006
various CDs with concert recordings, own label

References

External links 
 

German choirs
Culture of Mecklenburg-Western Pomerania
Rostock
Musical groups established in 1964
Music in Mecklenburg-Western Pomerania
1964 establishments in Germany